Devin Moore may refer to: 

 Devin Moore (American football)
 Devin Moore (murderer)